Merrifieldia hedemanni is a moth of the family Pterophoridae that is endemic to the Canary Islands.

The larvae feed on Micromeria varia.

References

Moths described in 1896
hedemanni
Endemic fauna of the Canary Islands
Moths of Africa